Antoniotto is a given name and a surname. Notable people with this name include the following:

Given name
Antoniotto Adorno (1340 – 1398), Italian nobleman
Antoniotto II Adorno (c. 1479 – 1528), Italian nobleman
Antoniotto Botta Adorno (1688 - 1774), Italian diplomat and military officer
Antoniotto di Montaldo (1368 - 1398), Italian nobleman
Antoniotto Usodimare (1416–1462), Genoese trader and explorer

Surname
Giorgio Antoniotto (1680–1766), Italian musician

See also